There are seven known rings of the Anglo-Saxon period (9th or 10th century) bearing futhorc inscriptions. Futhorc are Anglo-Saxon runes which were used to write Old English.

The most notable of the rings are the Bramham Moor Ring, found in the 18th century, and the Kingmoor Ring, found 1817, inscribed with a nearly identical magical runic formula read as 

A third ring, found before 1824 (perhaps identical to a ring found in 1773 at Linstock castle in Carlisle), has a magical inscription of a similar type, 

The remaining five rings have much shorter inscriptions.
 Wheatley Hill, County Durham, found 1993, now in the British Museum. Late 8th century. Inscription: "" (I am called ring).
 Coquet Island, Northumberland, found before 1866, now lost. Inscription: ""  (this is…).
 Cramond, Edinburgh, found 1869-70, now in the National Museum of Scotland. 9th-10th century. Inscription: ""
 Thames Exchange, London, found 1989, now in the Museum of London. Inscription: ""

Bramham Moor Ring

The Bramham Moor Ring, dated to the ninth century, was found in Bramham cum Oglethorpe, West Yorkshire in or before 1732 (now in the Danish National Museum, no. 8545).  It is made from electrum (gold with niello), with a diameter of c. 29 mm. and weighs 40.22 g.

The inscription reads

Kingmoor Ring

The Kingmoor Ring (also Greymoor Hill Ring) dates to the 9th or 10th century. It is of gold, with a diameter ca. 27 mm.

It was discovered in June 1817 at Greymoor Hill, Kingmoor, near Carlisle.
By 1859, the ring was in the possession of the British Museum (ring catalogue no. 184) who has received it from the Earl of Aberdeen. A replica is on exhibit in the Tullie House Museum and Art Gallery in Carlisle.

The inscription  reads

The final   is written on the inside of the ring. The inscription amounts to a total of 30 signs.

Where k is the late Futhorc  rune of the same shape as Younger Futhark , and the s is the so-called "bookhand s" looking similar to a Younger Futhark k, .

Linstock Castle Ring
A ring made of agate, perhaps dating to the 9th century, found before 1824. Now British Museum ring catalogue no. 186.
The inscription reads

Page (1999) takes this to be a corrupt version of the inscription of the Kingmoor and Bramham Moor rings.

The location where this ring was found is unrecorded, but Page (1999) suggests that it is identical to a ring found at Linstock Castle in 1773.
A note found among Thorkelin's archive documenting his travels to England between 1785 and 1791.
The paper records an obscure inscription, "", identified as "found in 1773 at Lynstock Castle  near Carlisle, & not far from the Picts Wall in Cumberland".
Page adduces a note from a sale catalogue of 1778 which lists "An ancient Runic ring, found near the Picts Well, 1773".

Wheatley Hill Finger-Ring
A gilded silver ring, dating to the 8th century, found in 1993 in Wheatley Hill, County Durham and now in the British Museum.

The inscription reads

The first and last runes are covered up by two of the three gem bosses that were later applied to the ring.  

Whilst runic inscriptions often refer to the object on which they're written, usually this is "me" or another suitable pronoun.  The Wheatley Hill Finger-Ring is unique amongst runic inscribed objects as identifying what type of object it is - a "ring".

Interpretation of the  charm
The sequence  found on both the Kingmoor and Bramham Moor Rings is interpreted as a spell for staunching blood, based on comparison with a charm containing the sequence  found in Bald's Leechbook (i.vii, fol. 20v). For this reason, the entire inscription is likely a protective or healing charm or spell with the ring serving as an amulet.

The charm in Leechbook is also found in Bodley MS:

The Leech book has the instruction: "to stop blood, poke into the ear with a whole ear of barley, in such a way that he [the patient] be unaware of it. Some write this:", followed by "either for horse or men, a blood-stauncher".

While the charm is "magical gibberish", there are a number of elements that can clearly be identified as Irish:  corresponds to Old Irish  "stream of blood". The .lll. has been taken as a corruption of the ogham letter  "alder", the  following it as the gloss  "it is a tree, i.e. 'alder'"
In the interpretation of Meroney (1945), the original text gave a list of ingredients for staunching blood, alder, curds, etc., with a gloss explaining one of them having slipped into the text.  is taken as Irish for "prohibition against bleeding",  as "against afflictions" (Old Irish ).

Fake rings
A number of fake rings, dating from the 18th century exist.  They are generally bronze, do not have niello letters but rather some kind of lacquer, and show signs of machining.

Notes

See also
List of runestones
Magic ring
Runic magic

References

Page, Raymond I. 'The Inscriptions,' Appendix A in Wilson, D. M. Anglo-Saxon Ornamental Metalwork 700-1100 in the British Museum. London:Trustees of the British Museum. pp. 67–90.
Page, Raymond I. (1999), "Two Runic Notes," Anglo-Saxon England, Volume 27, .
Okasha, Elisabeth (2003). "Anglo-Saxon Inscribed Rings." Leeds Studies in English, n.s. 34, pp. 29–45.
 p. 32.

External links
Anglo-Saxon Runic Rings (ansax.com February 2010)

Occult texts
Runic inscriptions
Anglo-Saxon runes
Rings (jewellery)